This is a list of seasons completed by the Xavier Musketeers men's college basketball team.

Seasons

  Travis Steele was fired after 32 games in the 2021–22 season, posting a 19–13 record. Jonas Hayes coached the remaining four games, finishing 4–0.
  After leaving Xavier to coach Arizona in 2009, Sean Miller was fired by Arizona in 2021 and rehired by Xavier in 2022.

Notes

Xavier Musketeers
 
Xavier Musketeers basketball seasons